Vicente Fermín Márquez y Carrizosa (born 1811 in Santo Domingo Yanhuitlán) was a Mexican clergyman and bishop for the Roman Catholic Archdiocese of Antequera, Oaxaca. He was ordained in 1835. He was appointed bishop in 1868. He died in 1887.

References 

1811 births
1887 deaths
Mexican Roman Catholic bishops
People from Oaxaca